Kai Compagner (born 17 July 1969) is a Dutch rower. He competed at the 1992 Summer Olympics and the 1996 Summer Olympics.

References

External links
 

1969 births
Living people
Dutch male rowers
Olympic rowers of the Netherlands
Rowers at the 1992 Summer Olympics
Rowers at the 1996 Summer Olympics
Sportspeople from Delft